This list article lists aerodromes which have been assigned an ICAO airport code, a 4-letter code, which starts with the letter "J".

Format of entries is:
 ICAO (IATA) – Airport Name – Airport Location

J: List

JZ

 JZRO (none) – Wright Brothers Field – Jezero Crater, Syrtis Major quadrangle, planet Mars.

Notes

References

See also

J